Thomas Maloney may refer to:
 Thomas J. Maloney (judge) (1925–2008), corrupt judge in Illinois, imprisoned 1994–2007
 Thomas J. Maloney (representative), Pennsylvania politician
 Thomas A. Maloney (1889–1986), politician in the state of California
 Thomas Francis Maloney (1903–1962), auxiliary bishop of Providence, Rhode Island

See also
Thomas Moloney (disambiguation)